State Highway 326 (SH 326)  is a  state highway in the U.S. state of Texas.  The highway begins at a junction with U.S. Highway 90 (US 90) and FM 365 in Nome and heads north to a junction with U.S. Highway 69 and US 287 in Kountze.

History
SH 326 was designated on February 13, 1940 to serve as a route between Sour Lake and Kountze. On November 16, 1943, the route was extended to the south to Nome.

Route description
SH 326 begins in East Texas at a junction with US 90 and FM 365 in Nome.  It heads north from this junction to an intersection with SH 105 in Sour Lake.  The highway continues to the north to an intersection with FM 421.  Heading north, the highway continues to a junction with FM 770.  The highway intersects FM 1293 as it enters the Kountze city limits.  SH 326 reaches its northern terminus at US 69 and US 287 in Kountze.

Junction list

References

326
Transportation in Jefferson County, Texas
Transportation in Hardin County, Texas